Robert Cocks may refer to:

 Robert Cocks & Co., bygone London publisher who worked with Maria Lindsay
 Sir Robert Cocks, 3rd Baronet (c. 1660–1736) of the Cocks Baronets
 Sir Robert Cocks, 4th Baronet (d. 1765) of the Cocks Baronets

See also
 Robin Cocks, geologist
 Robert Cock, explorer
 Robert Cox (disambiguation)
 Cocks (surname)